William Wilkinson (born 1934), is a male former athlete who competed for England.

Athletics career
Wilkinson was selected by England to represent his country in athletics events. He was late to athletics and gained his England debut during 1965 (aged 31) and when running for St Albans.

He was selected for the 5,000 metres at the 1966 European Athletics Championships but had to withdraw through injury. Later the same year he represented England in the 3 miles event, at the 1966 British Empire and Commonwealth Games in Kingston, Jamaica.

He was a member of the Saltwell Harriers Athletics Club and later the Bromsgrove and Redditch Club.

Personal life
He moved to live in Birmingham and was an electricity generating board engineer by trade.

References

1934 births
English male long-distance runners
Athletes (track and field) at the 1966 British Empire and Commonwealth Games
Living people
Commonwealth Games competitors for England